Gyeonggaksan is a mountain of North Jeolla Province, South Korea. It has an altitude of 659 metres.

See also
List of mountains of Korea

References

Imsil County
Wanju County
Mountains of North Jeolla Province
Mountains of South Korea